In mathematics, the classic Möbius inversion formula is a relation between pairs of arithmetic functions, each defined from the other by sums over divisors. It was introduced into number theory in 1832 by August Ferdinand Möbius.

A large generalization of this formula applies to summation over an arbitrary locally finite partially ordered set, with Möbius' classical formula applying to the set of the natural numbers ordered by divisibility: see incidence algebra.

Statement of the formula

 

then

In effect, the original  can be determined given  by using the inversion formula. The two sequences are said to be Möbius transforms of each other.

In the language of Dirichlet convolutions, the first formula may be written as

The second formula is then written as

Many specific examples are given in the article on multiplicative functions.

Thus
.
There is a product version of the summation-based Möbius inversion formula stated above:

Series relations
Let

so that

is its transform. The transforms are related by means of series: the Lambert series

and the Dirichlet series:

where  is the Riemann zeta function.

Repeated transformations
Given an arithmetic function, one can generate a bi-infinite sequence of other arithmetic functions by repeatedly applying the first summation. 

For example, if one starts with Euler's totient function , and repeatedly applies the transformation process, one obtains:

 the totient function
, where  is the identity function
, the divisor function

If the starting function is the Möbius function itself, the list of functions is:
, the Möbius function
 where  is the unit function
, the constant function

Both of these lists of functions extend infinitely in both directions.  The Möbius inversion formula enables these lists to be traversed backwards.

The generated sequences can perhaps be more easily understood by considering the corresponding Dirichlet series: each repeated application of the transform corresponds to multiplication by the Riemann zeta function.

Generalizations

then

This in turn is a special case of a more general form. If  is an arithmetic function possessing a Dirichlet inverse , then if one defines

then

A particular application of the first of these extensions arises if we have (complex-valued) functions  and  defined on the positive integers, with

Here it is straightforward to determine , but  is harder to compute.

Another inversion formula is (where we assume that the series involved are absolutely convergent):

As above, this generalises to the case where  is an arithmetic function possessing a Dirichlet inverse :

For example, there is a well known proof relating the Riemann zeta function to the prime zeta function that uses the series-based form of 
Möbius inversion in the previous equation when .
 

 

These identities for alternate forms of Möbius inversion are found in. 
A more general theory of Möbius inversion formulas partially cited in the next section on incidence algebras is constructed by Rota in.

Multiplicative notation
As Möbius inversion applies to any abelian group, it makes no difference whether the group operation is written as addition or as multiplication. This gives rise to the following notational variant of the inversion formula:

Proofs of generalizations

The first generalization can be proved as follows.  We use Iverson's convention that [condition] is the indicator function of the condition, being 1 if the condition is true and 0 if false.  We use the result that

that is, where  is the unit function.

We have the following:

The proof in the more general case where  replaces 1 is essentially identical, as is the second generalisation.

On posets

For a poset , a set endowed with a partial order relation , define the Möbius function  of  recursively by 

(Here one assumes the summations are finite.)

if and only if 

(See Stanley's Enumerative Combinatorics, Vol 1, Section 3.7.)

Contributions of Weisner, Hall, and Rota

See also

Farey sequence
Inclusion–exclusion principle

Notes

References

External links

Arithmetic functions
Enumerative combinatorics
Order theory

ru:Функция Мёбиуса#Обращение Мёбиуса